Aboaagla Abdalla Mohamed Ahmed (born 11 March 1993) is a Sudanese professional footballer who plays for the Sudanese national team.

He debuted internationally on 11 November 2015, at the 2018 FIFA World Cup qualifying match against Zambia in a 0-1 defeat.

On 18 November 2018, Ahmed scored his first goal for Sudan against Madagascar at the 2019 Africa Cup of Nations qualifying match in a 1-3 victory.

References

External links
 

1993 births
Living people
Sudanese footballers
Sudan international footballers
Al-Hilal Club (Omdurman) players
Association football midfielders
Sudan A' international footballers
2018 African Nations Championship players